Buyaqchi (also Romanized as Būyāqchī and Buiakhchi; also known as Bowyākhchī, Boyaghchi, and Boyāqchī) is a village in Jeyhun Dasht Rural District, Shara District, Hamadan County, Hamadan Province, Iran. At the 2006 census, its population was 179, in 34 families.

References 

Populated places in Hamadan County